Senator Palumbo may refer to:

Corey Palumbo (born 1972), West Virginia State Senate
Guy Palumbo (fl. 2010s), Washington State Senate
Mario Palumbo (1933–2004), West Virginia State Senate